The year 1929 in tennis was a complex mixture of mainly amateur tournaments composed of international, invitational, national, exhibition, and team (city leagues, country leagues, international knock-out tournaments) events and joined by regional professional tournaments limited mostly to British, German, French and American Pro events.

The professionals were mostly coaches who coached for a living, while amateur rules prohibited tennis players to benefit financially from playing. There were a few occasional professional against amateur challenges as well held in team competition format. The amateur events were almost all all-comers' event and the majority included a mixed title contest. The women's most successful players in the European international championships were Esna Boyd of Australia and two players from the United States Elizabeth Ryan who was thuspunished by the United States Lawn Tennis Association for her commitment to European events compared to those in the U.S. and Helen Wills Moody who won the two most prestigious tournaments in Europe, the French Championships and Wimbledon. The Four Musketeers dominated the rankings and tournaments worldwide. Also the Australian Championships was won by a British player, Colin Gregory.

The most important team cups were the Wightman Cup for women and the Davis Cup (called the International Lawn Tennis Challenge) and the Mitre Cup (South American version of the Davis Cup) for men. The 1929 Wightman Cup was its seventh edition and was organized by the United States Lawn Tennis Association between the teams of Great Britain and the United States. The 1929 International Lawn Tennis Challenge was its 24th edition and was organized by the International Tennis Federation. The tournament was split into the American and European zones. The winner of each sub-zone played in an Inter-Zonal Final. 24 teams entered the Europe Zone (including South Africa and Chile), while five nations participated in the America Zone. The United States defeated Cuba in the America Zone, but would then lose to France in the challenge round, giving France their third straight title. The final was played at Stade Roland Garros in Paris, France, on July 26–28.

Key 

This list includes men and women international tournaments (where at least several different nations were represented), main (annual) national championships, professional tour events and the Davis, Mitre, Wightman Cup.

January 
 German Davis Cup player Georg Demasius turned professional.
 Retired Wimbledon champion Wilfred Baddeley died in Menton.

February 
 The Davis Cup draw was held on 5th inst. in Paris. Gaston Doumergue were asked to select for the drawing of lots.
 The Sporting Club de Paris beat the Tennis Club de Paris 26 to 10 in an interclub meeting.
 Great Britain beat West Australia nine to one.
 Bill Tilden's amateur status, which was suspended from last November was requalified by the USTLA in Boston. His US number one ranking was also due to be regiven to him. He was scheduled to sail to Europe on 8 May alongside Francis Hunter to register for the Wimbledon and French Championships. However, it was also announced that none of them would be a part of the American Davis Cup team for its upcoming matches.

March 

 In the Bordighera ladies' final Lucia Valerio and Phyllis Satterthwaite played a 425-stroke point setting up a world record, which stood for 55 years.
 Jean Borotra was awarded permanently the US national indoors trophy after he won the tournament three consecutive times.
 Georges Glasser and André Martin-Legeay were promoted to the premier amateur tour by the Fédération Française de Tennis after both players reached the final of the French Criterium Tournament, a B category trials competition. They were allowed to enter first -class international tournaments onwards.
 Paul Féret returned to playing this month after his requalification back from professional status.
 Italian champion Lucia Valerio won her first titles in Menton (mixed doubles) and in Sanremo in singles.
 American Wallace F. Johnson turned professional and became the trainer of the University of Pennsylvania.
 The Romanian tennis authority split into two factions. All the clubs left the Federation of Sportive Societies in Romania and formed a Union of lawn tennis clubs headed by prominent Davis Club players such as Nicolae Mişu and László Dörner. It still remained an open question whether it'd be recognized by the ILTF.
 The following rule changes were adapted by the ILTF:
 "The Server shall not by the following movements of his feet be deemed "to change his position by walking or running:
 Slight movements of the feet which do not materially affect the location originally taken up by him.
 An unrestricted movement of one foot so long as the other foot maintains continuously its original contact with the ground.
 At no time during the delivery of the service (i.e. from the taking up of the stance to the moment of impact of the racket and the ball) may both feet be off the ground simultaneously.
 The word "feet" means the extremities of the legs below the ankles and at all times during the delivery of the service (as before described) every part of such extremities must be behind (i.e. further from the net than) the base line."

April 
 Danish Davis cup player Axel Petersen turned pro after a dispute with his own Danish Tennis Association on the refund of his travel costs. He immediately became the coach of the Norway Davis Cup team.
 The German and English Davis Cup trials were held.
 The pre-order for the Wimbledon Championships tickets exceeded 18,000 reservations, which was a 5,500 boost from previous year, while the actual seats were only at 3,500. The reservations required pre-payment. The anticipated income would have been $117,879, 49% uprise from 1928, if not for the money back guarantee for the overbooking, which totalled at $94,969 thus the predicted cash-in was just $22,910.
 Kathleen McKane Godfree announced her withdrawal from the Wimbledon Championships due to health issues.

May 
 The mixed French-German team meeting resulted in an overwhelming French victory. Only Christian Boussus lost a match.
 The Dutch women team lost to the Americans.
 Paris beat Amsterdam. The parisiens were led by Henri Cochet and Jacques Brugnon on the men's part.
 Violet Chamberlain beat Eileen Bennett in the Regent's Park.

June 
 The International Lawn Tennis Federation declared that it acknowledged only the Federation of Sportive Societies in Romania as the Romanian tennis governing body and only its member clubs are authorized to organize tennis events and prohibited players to enter any tournament, which weren't endorsed by the Romanian federation.
 The British ladies' team beat the South Africans'.
 The United States Davis Cup team beat flawlessly the British reserve Davis Cup team.
 René Lacoste announced his withdrawal from the Wimbledon Championships due to his business affairs.
 The German ladies' team had a close victory over the American women's team.
 Leila Claude-Anet became the French junior champion, André Merlin were crowned on the boys' part.
 The British ladies' team beat the French rivals without losing a match.

July 
 Olympian tennis player, promoter and referee Charles Voigt died during Wimbledon in London.
 An electronic scoreboard was introduced on the Wimbledon court for the first time in history.
 The Poland Davis Cup team beat the Hungarian reserve team by one rubber.
 The Oslo Cup was won by Torleif Torkildsen.
 The international tournament in Sárospatak (Hungary) was won by Béla von Kehrling. The field included various Davis Cup players such as Gheorghe Lupu, Alexandru Botez (Romania), Ludwig von Salm-Hoogstraeten (Austria), the Stołarow-brothers (Poland), Franjo Šefer (Yugoslavia) and the Hungary Davis Cup team.
 The Czechoslovakia Davis Cup team lost two non Davis-Cup matches in a row to Hungary (3-2) and South Africa (5-2).

August 
 Italian and French teams played a tie in Evian. None of the Four Musketeers participated.
 Elizabeth Ryan was expelled off the United States Wightman Cup team because of her excessive commitment to European tournaments. Despite the appeal of Helen Wills Moody Ryan was declared stateless in terms of tennis.
 Bill Tilden permanently won the Newport Casino Invitational trophy after three consecutive victories.

September 
 The British Wightman Cup team defeated the Californian State team five to one.
 The Hungarian-English mixed team match ended in 5-3.
 The Greece Davis Cup team beat the Hungarian reserve team 3-2
 Pál Aschner became the Hungarian boys' junior champion, Zsuzsi Havassy won the girls'.
 A 24-rubber Netherlands-Belgium non-Davis Cup match resulted in a massive Dutch victory.
 Jimmy Nuthall, Betty Nuthall's younger brother won the English junior championships alongside Margaret Scriven on the girls' part.
 Imre Takáts was sidelined with an appendectomy.
 Jenny Sandison was thought to have set a new lowest time record for a final when she won the Cranleigh final, which lasted only twenty minutes.

October 
 The France Davis Cup team lost to Japan in the latter's homeland.
 The French won the annual France-England covered court meeting in Queen's Club. Apart from the official programme the highlight was a Borotra-Tilden match, which also booked a French victory.
 Kay Lund was crowned German junior champion.
 The English amateurs beat the pros six to three.

November

December 
 World-ranked German Davis Cup player Hans Moldenhauer died in a motor accident.
 US player Fred Inman died of illness.
 Suzanne Lenglen retired from tennis.

Rankings 
These are the rankings compiled and published by Helen Wills Moody, world number one female player in March and A. Wallis Myers founder of the International Lawn Tennis Club of Great Britain in September.

Men's singles

Women's singles

Notes 
   George Lyttleton-Rogers was an Irish player but the rules of the Butler Trophy and Nations Cup required players to be of the same nationality thus Rogers represented Great Britain on those two occasions.
  Due to constant rain the South of France tournament was postponed to March and this year it was merged with the annual Parc Imperial L.T.C. de Nice tournament.
  Jon Henderson of The Guardian incorrectly dates the match to 1930. The record was broken in the 1984 Central Fidelity Banks International by Jean Hepner and Vicki Nelson-Dunbar with 643 shots.
  Lo Sport Fascista switches the results of Sanremo and Bordighera. It is apparent in their chronological order and match outcomes.

Footnotes

Works cited

Online media

Books

Periodicals

Tennisz és Golf

The Straits Times

Le Figaro

Le Petit Niçois

The Singapore Free Press

Other 
 
 
 
 
 
 
 
 
 
 
 
 
 
 
 
 
 
 
 
 
 
 
 
 
 
 
 
 
 
 
 
 
 
 
 
 
 
 

 
Tennis by year